Suiten-gū (水天宮) is the name of numerous Shinto shrines in Japan

List of shrines

Kurume Suiten-gū in Kurume, Fukuoka Prefecture
Tokyo Suiten-gū in Chūō, Tokyo

External links 

Shinto shrines in Japan